Méjannes-le-Clap is a commune in the Gard department in southern France. It is located 30 km north east of Alès, close to the river Cèze. It is a centre for outdoor activities and environmental tourism.

Geography

Climate

Méjannes-le-Clap has a hot-summer Mediterranean climate (Köppen climate classification Csa).

Population

See also
Communes of the Gard department

References

Communes of Gard